RRFC may refer to:

 Raith Rovers F.C., a professional football club based in Kirkcaldy who currently play in the Scottish Football League First Division
 Rathfern Rangers F.C., a Northern Irish football club
 Rathfriland Rangers F.C., a Northern Irish football club
 Reading R.F.C., an English rugby union club based in the village of Sonning, on the outskirts of Reading
 Risborough Rangers F.C., an English non-league football club